1 Kings 20 is the 20th chapter of the Books of Kings in the Hebrew Bible or the First Book of Kings in the Old Testament of the Christian Bible. The book is a compilation of various annals recording the acts of the kings of Israel and Judah by a Deuteronomic compiler in the seventh century BCE, with a supplement added in the sixth century BCE. This chapter belongs to the section comprising 1 Kings 16:15 to 2 Kings 8:29 which documents the period of Omri's dynasty. The focus of this chapter is the reign of king Ahab in the northern kingdom.

Text
This chapter was originally written in the Hebrew language and since the 16th century is divided into 43 verses.

Textual witnesses
Some early manuscripts containing the text of this chapter in Hebrew are of the Masoretic Text tradition, which includes the Codex Cairensis (895), Aleppo Codex (10th century), and Codex Leningradensis (1008).

There is also a translation into Koine Greek known as the Septuagint, made in the last few centuries BCE. Extant ancient manuscripts of the Septuagint version include Codex Vaticanus (B; B; 4th century) and Codex Alexandrinus (A; A; 5th century). The extant palimpsest Aq contains verses 7–17 in Koine Greek translated by Aquila of Sinope approximately in the early or mid-second century CE.

Ahab's victory over the Arameans (20:1–34)
1 Kings 20 and 22 record a series of wars between an Aramean king, Benhadad, and King Ahab
of Israel. With the help of prophetic oracles, the Israelite king managed to repeatedly defeat an aggressive, arrogant and stronger enemy. The Arameans initially regarded YHWH to be 'a mountain god who had no power on the plains' (verses 23), based on the religious and social history that YHWH's home was originally the mountains of southern Sinai and Edom (Exodus 3; Judges 5:4) and Israel was developed into an ethnic and political power on the mountains of Israel/Palestine (Judges 1:27-35; 1 Samuel 13–14; 2 Samuel 2:9). However, at the end it was shown that the entire country belongs to YHWH (and his people), even Ahab managed to force Ben-hadad to accept the establishment of an Israelite trading office in Damascus (verse 34). This period may fit the record from Assyrian sources that Ahab and the Aramean king, Adad-idri (Aramaic: "Hadadezer") were closely allied to each other to fight Assyrian army (ANET 276–277).

Verse 34
So Ben-Hadad said to him, "The cities which my father took from your father I will restore; and you may set up marketplaces for yourself in Damascus, as my father did in Samaria."Then Ahab said, "I will send you away with this treaty." So he made a treaty with him and sent him away."My father took from your father": may refer to Baasha during whose reign the Arameans (Syrians) took some cities from the kingdom of Israel, so "father" here has the sense of "predecessor", or refer to Omri, Ahab's father, who might have war with the Syrians but not recorded in the Scripture.

 A prophetic warning to Ahab (20:35–43)
The positive outcome of the war against Aram was tarnished by Ahab's action to make business contracts with Benhadad, instead of killing him  ("devoted him to destruction", which was an 'underlying principle of Deuteronomistic theory and historical writing'; cf. Deuteronomy 13:12–18; 20:16–18; Joshua 6–7; 11:10–15, etc.). The prophetic rebuke was given through a prophet's ingenious scheming which forced the king to call out his own error and 'bring judgement
upon himself' (cf. as Nathan did to David in 2 Samuel 12).

Verse 42And he said to him, "Thus says the Lord, ‘Because you have let go out of your hand the man whom I had devoted to destruction,[a] therefore your life shall be for his life, and your people for his people."''
 "Devoted to destruction": or "set apart (devoted) as an offering to the Lord (for destruction)". Like Saul who released an enemy king whom God had "devoted to destruction" (1 Samuel 15), Ahab's life was forfeit because he released Benhadad.

See also

Related Bible parts: Deuteronomy 13, Joshua 6, Joshua 7, 1 Samuel 15, 2 Samuel 12, 1 Kings 15, 1 Kings 16

Notes

References

Sources

External links
 Jewish translations:
 Melachim I - I Kings - Chapter 20 (Judaica Press). Hebrew text and English translation [with Rashi's commentary] at Chabad.org
 Christian translations:
 Online Bible at GospelHall.org (ESV, KJV, Darby, American Standard Version, Bible in Basic English)
 1 Kings chapter 20. Bible Gateway

20